Gascoyne is a surname. Notable people with the surname include:

 Chris Gascoyne (b. 1968), English actor known for his role as Peter Barlow in the soap opera Coronation Street
 Crisp Gascoyne (1700–1761), English businessman who became Lord Mayor of London
 David Gascoyne (1916–2001), English poet associated with the Surrealist movement
 Isaac Gascoyne (1763–1841), British Army officer and Tory politician
 James Gascoyne DFC (1892–1976), English World War I flying lieutenant
 James Gascoyne-Cecil, 2nd Marquess of Salisbury (1791–1868), English Conservative politician
 James Gascoyne-Cecil, 4th Marquess of Salisbury (1861–1947), Chancellor of the Duchy of Lancaster
 Joel Gascoyne (bap. 1650-1704), English chartmaker, mapmaker and surveyor
 Mike Gascoyne (b. 1963), British Formula One designer and engineer
 Thomas Gascoyne (1876–1917), English professional cycling champion